Liberal League (VL) was a Finnish liberal political party. VL existed from 1951 until 1965.

The party was founded in spring 1951 by the minority of National Progressive Party, led by Helsinki group, as the party finished its existence. Most of the former Progressive party members joined the People's Party of Finland.

VL included among others MP Rolf B. Berner, minister Teuvo Aura and the director of the Bank of Finland and once PM, Sakari Tuomioja. VL was heir to National Progressive Party seat in the Liberal International – People's Party was not accepted into the International as a result.

VL proposed Sakari Tuomioja as candidate for 1956 presidential elections. He was also supported by National Coalition Party. Tuomioja eventually lost the race to Urho Kekkonen, the Agrarian League candidate and a favourite of Moscow.

In 1965 the VL merged with the People's Party into Liberal People's Party, founded December 29, 1965 and the Eduskunta factions also merged.

Elections

Liberal parties in Finland
Defunct political parties in Finland
1951 establishments in Finland
1965 disestablishments in Finland
Political parties established in 1951
Political parties disestablished in 1965